Fyodor Samuilovich (Samoilovich) Kolchuk (September 15, 1894 – January 3, 1972) was a Soviet military officer. He was a soldier of the Imperial Russian Army in World War I who rose to the rank of major general of the Red Army during the Second World War. Kolchuk's career saw a variety of highs and lows, but he eventually compiled a distinguished record of service.

Biography
Kolchuk was born in western Belorussia in 1894, and was called up to the Tsar's army in 1915, but led a battalion of Red Guards in the revolution in Petrograd in 1917. While serving as a Red Guard he had the misfortune to be captured while fighting the White forces of Admiral Kolchak. He spent ten months in captivity before being conscripted into Kolchak's army in March, 1919, but soon deserted and joined the Red Army in May. He took command of a battalion on the Turkestan front later that year, and then in the Polish–Soviet War in 1920, where he was wounded in action. After the Civil War ended, Kolchuk graduated from the Vystrel Officers Course in 1924 and the Frunze Military Academy in 1931. During the 1920s he commanded each rifle regiment of the 24th Rifle Division in turn, and later the 4th Turkestan Rifle Regiment of the 2nd Rifle Division. Following the Frunze course he was appointed to command of Far Eastern Front's 6th Separate Railroad Exploration Brigade until April, 1936, and eventually earned the Order of the Red Banner of Labour.

During the Great Purge, Kolchuk was arrested in July, 1938, on charges of disloyalty and was sentenced to two years imprisonment. He was released into the reserves in July, 1941, and was first given command of the 182nd Reserve Rifle Regiment of Southern Front. On May 8, 1942, still carrying his pre-war rank of Kombrig, he took command of the 353rd Rifle Division, which he held until May 30, 1944, being promoted to Major General on November 17, 1942. He led his division through the campaigns in southern Ukraine until he was appointed to command of the 37th Rifle Corps in 46th Army. He held this post for the duration of the war, advancing through the Balkan states and into Austria. After the war he commanded rifle corps until 1950, finishing his career as chief of the 1st Automobile School. He retired in 1953 and died at Vinnytsia in Ukraine in 1972, at the age of 77.

References

Bibliography
  pp. 21, 275

External links
Maj. Gen. F.S. Kolchuk at Generals.dk

1894 births
1972 deaths
People from Zhabinka District
Frunze Military Academy alumni
Recipients of the Order of Kutuzov, 2nd class
Recipients of the Order of Lenin
Recipients of the Order of the Red Banner
Recipients of the Order of the Red Banner of Labour
Recipients of the Order of Suvorov, 2nd class
Russian military personnel of World War I
Soviet major generals
Soviet military personnel of the Polish–Soviet War
Soviet military personnel of the Russian Civil War
Soviet military personnel of World War II